The Middletown Rancheria of Pomo Indians of California is a federally recognized tribe of Pomo Indians, as well as some Wappo and Lake Miwok Indians, in California, headquartered in Middletown, California.

The tribe's reservation is the Middletown Rancheria, located north-northeast of Santa Rosa. It was established in 1910 and occupies  in Lake County. Approximately 73 tribal members live on the reservation.

The Middletown Pomos own the Twin Pine Casino and Hotel, located in Middletown.

Education
The ranchería is served by the Middletown Unified School District.

Notes

External links

Pomo tribe
Miwok
Native American tribes in California
Federally recognized tribes in the United States
1910 establishments in California